"Run the Show" is a song by American singer Kat DeLuna from her debut studio album 9 Lives. It was released as the second worldwide single off her debut album. While the album version features vocals from Shaka Dee, the single version features a new rap from Busta Rhymes. It was officially sent to big radio stations on January 15, 2008. The Spanish version features reggaeton artist Don Omar.

Release
The song was being rotated on U.S. radio stations in the week from December 5–11 and debuted at number 182 of the most played songs in American radios. Currently it has peaked at number 45. It debuted on z100 December 20, 2007, and has received considerable airplay. The song debuted at #88 on the Pop 100 and #50, and on the Pop 100 Airplay. The song was released digitally in the United States on February 5, 2008. The Spanish single version was later released on March 11, 2008.

The song was released on March 17, 2008 in France.

On June 2, 2008, the single debuted at #41 on the UK Singles Chart on downloads alone. For a time it had regular airplay on UK music channels and radio stations but the song failed to chart any higher than number 41 due to a lack of promotion.

The song was released in Germany on October 31, 2008.

Music video
The music video for "Run the Show" featuring Busta Rhymes premiered on Thursday, March 13, 2008 at her website, while the video featuring Don Omar premiered on Friday, March 21, 2008 at Mun2 on Pepsi Musica.
Both videos were directed by Ray Kay.

Covers and Samples
Britney Spears sampled the song in her single "Break the Ice" as video interlude during her 2009 The Circus Starring: Britney Spears tour.

Track listings
Digital download
"Run the Show" - 3:33
Promo CD
"Run the Show" - 3:33
"Run the Show" (Instrumentall)  - 3:35
Run the Show (iTunes Digital Remixes) - EP
"Run the Show (Radio Mix)" - 3:41
"Run the Show" (Club Vocal Up)  - 8:16
"Run the Show" (Club Dub) - 7:26
"Run the Show" (Ashanti Boyz remix)  - 3:35
"Run the Show"  (Warehouse Mix)  -  6:46

Charts

Weekly charts

Year-end charts

Sales and certifications

Release history

References

External links
Music video

2008 singles
Busta Rhymes songs
Kat DeLuna songs
Don Omar songs
Music videos directed by Ray Kay
Song recordings produced by RedOne
Songs written by RedOne
2007 songs
Epic Records singles
Songs written by Kat DeLuna